Qaleh Juq-e Najafqoli Khan (also Romanized as Qal‘eh Jūq-e Najafqolī Khān; also known as Qal‘eh Jūq) is a village in Owch Tappeh-ye Gharbi Rural District of Torkamanchay District, Mianeh County, East Azerbaijan province, Iran. At the 2006 National Census, its population was 626 in 105 households. The following census in 2011 counted 474 people in 114 households. The latest census in 2016 showed a population of 447 people in 135 households; it was the largest village in its rural district.

References 

Meyaneh County

Populated places in East Azerbaijan Province

Populated places in Meyaneh County